Cathleen Farrell (born March 16, 1957) is an American former professional tennis player.

Farrell grew up in Dunkirk, New York and after finishing high school trained under Finnish tennis coach Rauno Suominen in Buffalo. She began competing on the international tour during the late 1970s and in 1980 featured in the singles main draw of two WTA Tour tournaments. Her career titles include the 1983 Arthur Ashe Tennis Classic held in Flushing Meadows. She is a member of both the Chautauqua Sports Hall of Fame and Buffalo Tennis Hall of Fame.

References

External links
 
 

1957 births
Living people
American female tennis players
Tennis people from New York (state)
People from Dunkirk, New York